Bentong is an Austronesian language of Sulawesi, Indonesia, that is closely related to Makassarese.

References

Languages of Sulawesi
South Sulawesi languages